In the theory of computation, the Sudan function is an example of a function that is recursive, but not primitive recursive. This is also true of the better-known Ackermann function. The Sudan function was the first function having this property to be published.

It was discovered (and published ) in 1927 by Gabriel Sudan, a Romanian mathematician who was a student of David Hilbert.

Definition

Value tables

In general, F1(x, y) is equal to F1(0, y) + 2y x.

Notes and references

Bibliography

External links
 OEIS: A260003, A260004

Arithmetic
Large integers
Special functions
Theory of computation